Moutiers (Gallo: Móstiers) is a commune in the Ille-et-Vilaine department of Brittany in northwestern France.

Population
Inhabitants of Moutiers are called in French moutierrains.

See also
Communes of the Ille-et-Vilaine department

References

External links

Mayors of Ille-et-Vilaine Association 

Communes of Ille-et-Vilaine